Lynn Gehl is an Algonquin Anishinaabe-kwe from the Ottawa River Valley, Ontario, Canada. She is a writer, blogger and Indigenous human rights advocate. Gehl was involved in legal challenges aimed at eliminating the continued sex discrimination in the Indian Act. She is also an outspoken critic of the contemporary land claims and self-government process, as well as Indigenous issues in Canada. In April 2017, Gehl was successful in defeating Indian and Northern Affairs Canada’s unstated paternity policy when the Court of Appeal for Ontario ruled the sex discrimination in the policy was unreasonable.

Early life and education
Lynn was born and raised in Toronto, Ontario. Her grandmother was from Golden Lake First Nation. She studied chemical technology at Humber College of Applied Arts and Technology and worked for more than a decade monitoring Ontario's waterways for toxic organic pollutants. She left and returned to school, studying anthropology at York University and later completed a masters and PhD in Indigenous Studies. She transformed her doctoral dissertation into a book titled "The Truth that Wampum Tells: My Debwewin on the Algonquin Land Claims Process" (2014).

Sex descrimination under The Indian Act
Because Gehl did not know her grandfather's paternity (her father's father) she was denied Indian status registration and consequently denied band membership. This led to her developing a legal case to fight sex discrimination under The Indian Act.  In the course of this effort, Gehl discovered that INAC had an unknown paternity policy, wherein Indian women who had children where a father could not be named on the birth certificate, the children would not be eligible for full Indian status or they would be denied Indian status. On April 20, 2017, the Ontario Court of Appeal granted Gehl the right to register as an "Indian" under the Indian Act. But in the end, she was only awarded Indian status under 6(2), rather than 6(1)(a), which would allow her to pass down her status to her descendants. Thus she was faced with additional sex discrimination.

In 2019, Gehl, along with other Indigenous women, launched a "6(1)a All the Way!" campaign to lobby the federal government to eliminate residual sex-based discrimination within the Indian Act. They were successful where through this effort additional sex discrimination was addressed. Lynn was then "upgraded" to 6(1)a Indian status.

Selected Publications 
 Gehl v Canada: Challenging Sex Discrimination in the Indian Act (2021)
 Claiming Anishinaabe: Decolonizing the Human Spirit (2017)
 The Truth that Wampum Tells: My Debwewin on the Algonquin Land Claims Process (2014)
 Mkadengwe: Sharing Canada's Colonial Process through Black Face Methodology (2014)
 Anishinaabeg Stories: Featuring Petroglyphs, Petrographs, and Wampum Belts (2012)

Awards 
 Nicol, Vince, & Wensley Book Prize in Anthropology, York University (1999)
 Bachelor of Arts with Honours (summa cum laude), York University, Socio-Cultural Anthropology (2022)
 Governor General's Award in Commemoration of the Persons Case (2022)

References

External links 
 Interview with Lynn Gehl on The Agenda with Steve Paikin, November 2021
 Interview with Lynn Gehl by Lisa Berry for documentary, "Doctrine of Discovery: Stolen Lands, Strong Hearts", April 2018
 Interview of Lynn Gehl as part of the 2017 Stories of Resistance, Resurgence, and Resilience workshops
 Deposition by Lynn Gehl at House of Commons Committee meeting  re: Bill S-3, June 8, 2017
 Lynn Gehl archival fonds held at the Clara Thomas Archives & Special Collections, York University Libraries, York University

1962 births
Living people
Activists from Toronto
First Nations women writers
21st-century First Nations writers
First Nations activists
Women human rights activists
Canadian human rights activists
Writers from Toronto
21st-century Canadian women writers
Governor General's Award in Commemoration of the Persons Case winners